General elections were held in Niue on 6 May 2017.

Electoral system
The 20 members of the Assembly are elected by two methods; 14 are elected from single-member consistencies and six are elected from a single nationwide constituency. Both types of seat use first-past-the-post voting.

Results

Nationwide seats

Constituency seats

References

Election and referendum articles with incomplete results
Elections in Niue
Niue
General election
Niue
Non-partisan elections